C-Bo's Best Appearances '91-'99 is a compilation of previously released songs featuring American rapper C-Bo. It was released April 10, 2001 on AWOL Records. The songs originally appeared on other artists albums and compilations released throughout the nineties.

Track listing
"Die Niggaz" - 3:54
"Deadly Weapon" (featuring Marvaless) - 3:51 (from the album Fearless)
"What's Going Down" (featuring Gelo) - 3:54 (from the album Havin' It My Way)
"The Funk Is On" (featuring Lunasicc & Marvaless) - 4:14 (from the album Mr. Lunasicc)
"Niggaz Get They Wig Split" (featuring B-Legit & Celly Cel) - 3:23 (from the album The Hemp Museum)
"That's How We Break Bread" (featuring King George & Master P) - 3:28 (from the album True)
"Ride 4 Me" (featuring Rod-Dee & Spice 1) - 4:27 (from the album The Playa Rich Project)
"Garden Block" - 5:44
"Riders" - 4:30 (from the album Boss Ballin' 2: The Mob Bosses)
"Danger Zone" (featuring Killa Tay & Mississippi) - 4:04 (from the album Fear No Fate)
"Rillas In Tha Game" (featuring LeMay & Marv Mitch) - 4:31 (from the album Livin In Tha Strange)
"Mafia Life" (featuring Killa Tay, Lunasicc, Mississippi & Pizzo) - 4:37 (from the album West Coast Trippin')
"It's on, on Sight" (featuring E-40) - 4:13 (from the album The Element of Surprise)
"Big Dawgs" (featuring J-Dubb, Killa Tay & O-Fed) - 4:29 (from the album Mr. Mafioso)
"Straight G'z" (featuring Pizzo) - 1:40 (from the album Heater Calhoun)
"Player to Player" (featuring Allie Baba & Mo-Jay) - 4:27 (from the album The Final Chapter)

External links
[ C-Bo's Best Appearances '91-'99] at Allmusic
C-Bo's Best Appearances '91-'99 at Tower Records

C-Bo albums
2001 compilation albums
Albums produced by Rick Rock
Albums produced by Studio Ton
Gangsta rap compilation albums
Self-released albums
G-funk compilation albums